Wang Ke (born August 1931) is a general (shangjiang) of the People's Liberation Army (PLA). He was a member of the 14th and 15th Central Committee of the Chinese Communist Party. He was a delegate to the 9th National People's Congress.

Biography
Wang was born in Xiao County (now belongs to Anhui), Jiangsu, in August 1931. He enlisted in the New Fourth Army in 1944 and took part in the Second Sino-Japanese War. During the Chinese Civil War, he served in the 21st Army. In 1952, he commissioned as battalion commander of artillery regiment of the 21st Army, participating in the Korean War. After graduating from Shenyang Advanced Artillery School, he taught at military schools.

In 1986, he was appointed commander of the Lanzhou Military Region, he remained in that position until 1992, when he was transferred to Shenyang Military Region and appointed commander. He was made head of the People's Liberation Army General Logistics Department in September 1995, and served until his retirement in November 2002. 

He was promoted to the rank of lieutenant general (zhongjiang) in 1988 and general (shangjiang) in 1994.

References

1931 births
Living people
People from Xiao County
Central Party School of the Chinese Communist Party alumni
People's Liberation Army generals from Anhui
People's Republic of China politicians from Anhui
Chinese Communist Party politicians from Anhui
Commanders of the Shenyang Military Region
Commanders of the Lanzhou Military Region
Delegates to the 9th National People's Congress
Members of the 14th Central Committee of the Chinese Communist Party
Members of the 15th Central Committee of the Chinese Communist Party